Biochemistry is a peer-reviewed academic journal in the field of biochemistry. Founded in 1962, the journal is now published weekly by the American Chemical Society, with 51 or 52 annual issues. The journal's 2015 impact factor was 2.876, and it received a total of 79,348 citations in 2015.

The previous editor-in-chief was Richard N. Armstrong (Vanderbilt University School of Medicine) (2004–16). After his death, Alanna Schepartz (UC Berkeley) was appointed editor-in-chief.

Indexing
Biochemistry is indexed in:

References

External links
Biochemistry website
NCBI: Biochemistry

Publications established in 1962
American Chemical Society academic journals
Biochemistry journals
English-language journals
Weekly journals